Kleeman is a surname. Notable people with the surname include:

Alexandra Kleeman (born 1986), American writer
Jenny Kleeman, British documentary film-maker and journalist 
Otto Kleemann (1855–1936), American architect

See also
 Klee (surname)

Jewish surnames
Yiddish-language surnames
German-language surnames